The Odd Man Out Tour was a 2005 concert tour co-headlined by Ben Folds, Ben Lee, and Rufus Wainwright. The tour began in Vienna, Virginia, on August 3.

Tour dates

References

2005 concert tours
Ben Folds
Co-headlining concert tours
Rufus Wainwright